Nakhon Sawan is one of Thailand's seventy-six provinces (changwat). It lies in lower northern Thailand, neighbouring Kamphaeng Phet, Phichit, Phetchabun, Lopburi, Sing Buri, Chai Nat, Uthai Thani, and Tak (clockwise from north).

Toponymy
The word nakhon originates from the Sanskrit word nagara meaning 'city', and the word sawan from Sanskrit svarga meaning 'heaven'. Hence the name of the province literally means 'city of heaven' or 'heavenly city'.

History
Nakhon Sawan province was a city since Dvaravati era. While part of the Sukhothai Kingdom, it was called Mueang Phra Bang, the southern frontier city of Sukhothai. Later within the Ayutthaya kingdom it was an important trade center because of its location at the two major rivers from the north. It also was the common meeting point of Burmese troops before moving to attack Ayutthaya. In the reign of King Taksin the Great, Phra Bang became a Siamese military base to prevent further Burmese attacks.

When King Mongkut signed the Bowring Treaty with Britain the glorious time of Nakhon Sawan began, as it became the main rice and teak trading centre. However the opening of the northern railway in 1922, the economic crisis before 1932 revolution, and finally the opening of Dejativongse bridge and Phahonyothin highway in 1950 each decreased the importance of water transportation and thus made Nakhon Sawan less important.

When in 1895 King Chulalongkorn established the monthon as part of the Thesaphiban administrative reform, Nakhon Sawan became capital city of Monthon Nakhon Sawan.

The 4th Infantry Regiment of the 3rd Area Army is based in Nakhon Sawan. It is responsible for defending the northwestern border with Burma, from Mae Hong Son in the north to Kanchanaburi in the south.

Geography
The Ping and Nan rivers merge near the city of Nakhon Sawan to form the Chao Phraya River. Mae Wong National Park, on the border with Khamphaeng Phet province, was created in 1987 to preserve the woodlands of Mae Wong-Mae Poen.

Bueng Boraphet is the largest freshwater wetland in Thailand, in total covering 212 km2. The swamp is directly east of the town Nakhon Sawan and extends into the districts of Tha Tako and Chum Saeng. During the winter months many waterfowl migrate there. Parts of the swamp, covering 106 km2, are protected as a non-hunting area.

There is one national park, along with two other national parks, make up region 12 (Nakhon Sawan) of Thailand's protected areas.

National park
 Mae Wong National Park,

Symbols
The provincial seal shows a Wiman, a mythological heavenly castle. This relates to the name of the province which translates to 'Heavenly City'.

The provincial tree as well as the flower is Lagerstroemia loudonii (Loudon's crape myrtle). Iridescent shark (Pangasianodon hypophthalmus) is the provincial fish.

Administrative divisions

The province is divided in 15 districts (amphoe). These are further divided into 130 subdistricts (tambon) and 1,328 villages (muban).

Local government
As of 26 November 2019 there are: one Nakhon Sawan Provincial Administration Organisation and 21 municipal (thesaban) areas in the province. Nakhon Sawan has city (thesaban nakhon) status and Takhli and Chum Saeng have  town (thesaban mueang) status. Further 18 subdistrict municipalities (thesaban tambon). The non-municipal areas are administered by 121 Subdistrict Administrative Organisations - SAO (ongkan borihan suan tambon).

Transport

Roads
Nakhon Sawan lies on Route 1 (Phahonyothin Road), which runs from Bangkok through Ayutthaya and Saraburi before passing through Nakhon Sawan, then continues through Kamphaeng Phet, Lampang, and Chiang Rai until it reaches the border with Burma at Mae Sai. Route 117 leads north to Phitsanulok, and Route 225 leads east to Chaiyaphum.

Rail
Nakhon Sawan has a station, Nakhon Sawan Railway Station, on the Northern Line of the State Railway of Thailand. The station is on the east side of the river, opposite the main city on the west side.

Air
Nakhon Sawan is served by Nakhon Sawan Airport.

Health 
Sawanpracharak Hospital is the main hospital of the province.

Human achievement index 2017

Since 2003, United Nations Development Programme (UNDP) in Thailand has tracked progress on human development at sub-national level using the Human achievement index (HAI), a composite index covering all the eight key areas of human development. National Economic and Social Development Board (NESDB) has taken over this task since 2017.

Festivals
Pak Nam Pho Chinese New Year Festival: Nakhon Sawan is considered a province with a large population of Thai Chinese descent. The Chinese New Year festival here is therefore a great celebration and held continuously for over 100 years along with attracts tourists from all over, both domestically and internationally.
Tak Bat Theworohana Festival: The tradition of offering food to monks during the Buddhist Lent Festival (around late October to early November before Loi Krathong) at Wat Khao Kob, a temple on the highest mountaintop of Nakhon Sawan city.

Attractions 
 Bueng Boraphet 
 Mae Wong National Park

References

External links
Province page from the Tourist Authority of Thailand

The Official Website of Nakhon Sawan from the Governor Office
Nakhon Sawan provincial map, coat of arms and postal stamp
Information and Pictures about Nakhon Sawan

 
Provinces of Thailand